The TAI Aksungur is an unmanned aerial vehicle (UAV) built by Turkish Aerospace Industries (TAI) for the Turkish Armed Forces. Using existing technology from the TAI Anka series of drones, it is the manufacturer's largest drone with payload capacity for mission-specific equipment. It is intended to be used for long-term surveillance, signals intelligence, maritime patrol missions, or as an unmanned combat aerial vehicle. TAI planned to integrate weapon packages and put the Aksungur into production in early 2020. The first unit was delivered to the Turkish Naval Forces on 20 October 2021.

Development
Aksungur, Turkish for gyrfalcon, is classified as a medium-altitude long-endurance (MALE) unmanned aerial vehicle (UAV). It is designed and manufactured by Turkish Aerospace Industries (TAI) for tactical surveillance and reconnaissance missions of the Turkish Armed Forces. The Aksungur has twin turbocharged engines with a twin boom configuration.

Developing the UAV took 18 months. The airframe, wing and landing gear are new designs, while control systems are from the existing TAI Anka family of drones. A new turbodiesel engine is also in development for the programme, with initial flight tests of the airframe using an existing engine. Two prototypes were manufactured for testing purposes. Its maiden flight, displaying automatic takeoff and landing capabilities, took place on 20 March 2019, and lasted four hours and twenty minutes. Reportedly, a second test flight of three hours was performed on 3 April the same year. It was introduced at the 2019 International Defence Industry Fair (IDEF) in Istanbul, Turkey, on 30 April. CNN Türk reported ongoing flight tests in July 2019, with the manufacturer anticipating a total of 50 to 60 tests by the end of the year. The UAV is planned to go into series production by the first quarter of 2020.

Design
The wings end with small winglets. The centralized fuselage is under the wings and houses avionics, camera and sensors systems, with a chin-mounted camera blister. Fuel is stored in the fuselage and wings. A turbocharged engine is mounted under each wing, with the engine nacelles each extending backward into a tail boom. These tail booms terminate in vertical stabilizers, with a horizontal tailplane joining them. The tricycle landing gear retracts into the engine nacelles and the nose of the aircraft while in flight.

The aircraft is powered by two forward-mounted PD-170 dual-turbocharged diesel engines developed by Tusaş Engine Industries (TEI), equipped with three-bladed propellers in a tractor (puller) configuration. It is rated to stay aloft 12 hours as an attack aircraft or maritime patrol aircraft and 24 hours during signals intelligence missions.

Remote control of the UAV is performed by DO-178B compatible software on DO-254 compatible ground control station and hardware using double backed-up encrypted digital data link. Optional beyond-visual-range operation flexibility is available via communications satellite.

TAI expects to integrate weapon systems typical of F-4 and F-16 fighter aircraft onto Aksungur in the last quarter of 2019.
Three hardpoints are situated under each wing for attaching external payloads, such as munitions or sonar buoys. Proposed armaments include TEBER-81 (laser-guided bomb Mk-81), TEBER-82 (laser-guided bomb Mk-82), LUMTAS, MAM-L, Roketsan Cirit, MAM-C, HGK-3 (precision-guided munition), KGK (82) (winged guided kit), and miniature bomb.

Operational history 
On 2 September 2020, TAI Aksungur flew the fifty-ninth test flight by staying in the air for 49 hours. On 17 September 2020, TAI Aksungur flew at an altitude of 20,000 feet for 20 hours carrying 12 MAM-L smart munitions.

TAI Aksungur carried an MK-82 bomb with a Teber guidance kit weighing 250kg and hit a target at a 30km distance.

Turkey is using Aksungur for dropping Sonobuoy in the sea, in order to find the Greek submarines.

Operators
 

 Turkish Naval Forces – 3 operational.
 Turkish Air Force - 3 estimated operational.

Future operators 

 Algerian Air Force – 6 drones were ordered in October 2022.

 National Air Force of Angola- Unknown number on order.

 Kyrgyz Air Force- Unknown number on order.

Specifications

See also
 Bayraktar Mini UAV
 Bayraktar TB2
 Bayraktar Akıncı
 Bayraktar Tactical UAS
 TAI Anka
 Tengden TB-001

References

External links

"ANKA-AKSUNGUR performed its maiden flight on 20 March 2019" on YouTube

Aksungur
Twin-boom aircraft
High-wing aircraft
Twin piston-engined tractor aircraft
Medium-altitude long-endurance unmanned aerial vehicles
Military robots
Unmanned military aircraft of Turkey
Aircraft first flown in 2019